Little Neshaminy Creek is a tributary of the Neshaminy Creek, part of the Delaware River Watershed rising near the intersection of U.S. Route 202 and Pennsylvania Route 309 near Montgomeryville, Pennsylvania and meets its confluence with Neshaminy Creek at the Neshaminy's 24.10 River mile.

History
There were a number of mills erected on the Little Neshaminy including the Old Hartsville Mill and the Upper and Lower Mearns' Mills. In 1942 there were ten bridges across the creek.

Statistics
The Geographic Name Information System I.D. is 1179624, U.S. Department of the Interior Geological Survey I.D. is 02638.

Course
Rising in Montgomery Township the Little Neshaminy Creek runs generally east for about  passing through Windlestrae Park on the way where it meets unnamed tributary from the left, and another unnamed tributary from the right to the east of the park, then it runs southeast for  touching Nike Park, then the Bradford Reservoir Recreation Area and dam where it meets another tributary from the right in the reservoir and meets Park Creek from the right below the reservoir at the Little Neshaminy's 6.32 river mile. Finally, it runs generally east for about  picking up one tributary from the left and five on the right where it meets its confluence at the Neshaminy Creek's 24.10 River mile.

Geology
Appalachian Highlands Division
Piedmont Province
Gettysburg Newark Lowland Section
Lockatong Formation
The Little Neshaminy lies entirely within the Lockatong geologic formation, consisting of argillite, shale, limestone, and calcareous shale.

Named tributaries
Park Creek

Municipalities
Bucks County
Northampton Township
Warwick Township
Warminster Township
Warrington Township
Montgomery County
Horsham Township
Montgomery Township

Crossings and bridges

See also
List of rivers of Pennsylvania
List of rivers of the United States
List of Delaware River tributaries

References

Rivers of Pennsylvania
Tributaries of the Neshaminy Creek
Rivers of Bucks County, Pennsylvania